7... is the seventh studio album by American R&B band Mint Condition released on April 5, 2011. It is the first album the band has released on the label Shanachie Records. The album title refers to this being their seventh album in their 20 years of performing.  At under 46 minutes, it also is distinctive as being the shortest album in their catalog. The album cover was photographed by bassist Ricky Kinchen, who has done the photography for all Mint Condition albums since 1999's Life's Aquarium.

The music videos released from the album are recognized for their ties to actors. Actress Regina King directed the video for the Kelly Price duet "Not My Daddy". The video for the single "Walk On" stars Carl Anthony Payne II of The Cosby Show and Martin fame.

Critical reception

In a review for AllMusic, critic reviewer Andy Kellman wrote: "It’s a shame this band gets a small fraction of the airplay granted to those who have followed in their footsteps. Two decades into their career, they're making some of their best music."

Track listing

Personnel

Band members
 Stokley Williams – lead vocals, background vocals, keyboards, bass, guitar, drums, steel pan, mixing, mastering
 Lawrence El – piano, keyboards
 Ricky Kinchen – guitar, bass, keyboards, background vocals, drum programming, photography
 Homer O'Dell – guitar, sitar
 Jeffrey Allen – keyboards, organ, background vocals
Additional musicians
 Kelly Price – lead and background vocals on "Not My Daddy"
 Brandon Commodore – drums on "Mind Slicker"
 Darnell Davis – organ on "Unsung"
 K. Jackson – rap on "7"
 Tonia Hughes-Kendrick – vocals on "Unsung"
 Arion-Brasil Williams – shaker on "Can't Get Away"
 Aaliyah Kellogg – additional backgrounds on "Can't Get Away"

Production
 Dave Darlington – mastering, mixing
 Brian Johnson – mixing on "Caught My Eye"

Charts

Weekly charts

Year-end charts

References

2011 albums
Mint Condition (band) albums
Shanachie Records albums